Nathan Neudorf  is a Canadian politician who serves as the deputy premier of Alberta with Kaycee Madu, and as the minister of Infrastructure. He elected in the 2019 Alberta general election to represent the electoral district of Lethbridge-East in the 30th Alberta Legislature.

Electoral history

References

United Conservative Party MLAs
Living people
21st-century Canadian politicians
Year of birth missing (living people)